Brandywine Middle/Senior High School is a public high school in Niles Charter Township, Berrien County, Michigan, United States. It is part of the Brandywine Community Schools district.

Athletics 
Brandywine Middle/Senior High School's athletic teams are called the Bobcats and they compete in the Lakeland Conference. School colors are gold and maroon. The following Michigan High School Athletic Association (MHSAA) sanctioned sports are offered:

 Baseball (Boys')
 Basketball (Girls' and Boys')
 Bowling (Girls' and Boys')
 Cross Country (Girls' and Boys')
 Football (Boys')
 Golf (Boys')
 Soccer (Girls' and Boys')
 Softball (Girls')
Swim and Dive (Boys')
 Tennis (Girls' and Boys')
 Track and Field (Girls' and Boys')
 Volleyball (Girls')
 Wrestling (Boys')

Notable alumni 

 Diane Seuss — poet, finalist for a Pulitzer Prize
 Guy Murray — former cross country runner and current coach, head coach for both the men's and women's University of Detroit Mercy Titans cross country and track and field teams

References 

Public high schools in Michigan
Schools in Berrien County, Michigan
Niles, Michigan
Berrien County, Michigan